The 2019  Men's PSA World Series Finals was the men's edition of the PSA World Tour Finals (Prize money : $160,000). The top 8 players in the 2018–19 PSA World Tour are qualified for the event. The event took place at Mall of Arabia, Cairo in Egypt from 9–14 June 2019.

It was the first edition under the PSA World Tour Finals label after the PSA renamed PSA World Series to current PSA World Tour Finals. CIB sponsored the event.

Mohamed El Shorbagy was the defending champion but lost in Semifinals to Karim Abdel Gawad. Gawad won his first PSA Finals title after defeating fellow countryman Mohamed Abouelghar 3–2 in a marathon match (92m). Karim started the match winning first two games 2–0, before Abouelghar equalled it 2–2. Karim Abdel Gawad won the last game 12–10 (3–2) becoming new champion.

PSA World Ranking Points
PSA also awards points towards World Ranking. Points are awarded as follows:

Match points distribution
Points towards the standings are awarded when the following scores:

Qualification & Seeds

Qualification
Top eight players at 2018–19 PSA World Tour standings qualifies to Finals.

Seeds

Group stage results
Times are Eastern European Time (UTC+02:00). To the best of three games.

Group A

Standings

Group B

Standings

Knockout stage

Semifinal
To the best of three games.

Final
To the best of five games.

See also
2019 Women's PSA World Tour Finals
2018–19 PSA World Tour Finals
PSA World Tour Finals
2018–19 PSA World Tour

References

External links
PSA World Tour Finals at PSA website
PSA World Tour Finals official website

PSA World Tour
M
PSA World Tour Finals
PSA World Tour Finals